Margaret Barnes, known in history under her sobriquet Long Meg of Westminster (fl. 1553), was an English innkeeper. She is an historic person, but the subject of a number of legends and fictional or unconfirmed stories and anecdotes. She may have been born Margaret Cleefe, who is found in a contemporaneous register marrying a Richard Barnes on 22 November 1551.

Margaret Barnes was born in Lancashire but settled in London early on. She was a camp follower laundress in the English army during Henry VIII's campaign to Boulogne 1543–44, during which she is claimed to have shown great courage. Upon her return to London, she married a soldier and opened a successful tavern frequented by soldiers in Islington. She is described as a tall and muscular woman, who threatened anyone who caused fights in her tavern by fighting with her outside.

In May 1561, she voluntarily appeared before the Bridewell Board of Governors to clear her name following rumors that she ran a Bawdy house. This was instigated by the arrests of several of her associates who were investigated for prostitution. Following this, she moved to Westminster, where a year later she was accused of similar charges.

References 

 Carole Levin, Anna Riehl Bertolet, Jo Eldridge Carney, A Biographical Encyclopedia of Early Modern Englishwomen

Women in 16th-century warfare
16th-century English businesswomen
Businesspeople from London